Richard L. Brooks (born December 9, 1962) is an American actor, singer, and director. He played the eccentric bounty hunter Jubal Early in the space-western Firefly and assistant district attorney Paul Robinette in the NBC drama series Law & Order from 1990 to 1993, later appearing as a defense attorney on that same show. In 2013, he began starring as Patrick Patterson in the BET drama series, Being Mary Jane.

Early life
Born and raised in Cleveland, Ohio, Brooks studied acting, dance, and voice work at Interlochen Academy of Arts in Michigan. Later, he moved to New York City and was a student of the Circle in the Square Professional Theater School.

Career
While in New York, Brooks performed in the Eugene O'Neill Theater Conference production of August Wilson's Fences, which gained him a positive reputation. A subsequent move to Los Angeles found the actor landing television roles in Hill Street Blues and The Russians Are Coming, along with made-for-TV features such as Badge of the Assassin (1985) and Resting Place (1986). With Teen Wolf (1985), The Hidden (1987), Off Limits (1988), Shakedown (1988), and Shocker (1989), Brooks began his work in the world of feature films. Brooks appeared as OD in the award-winning film 84C MoPic (1989), directed by Patrick Sheane Duncan.

Throughout the 1990s, most of his popularity came from his widespread exposure in his role as Paul Robinette on Law & Order. However, the actor would constantly find himself alternating between the feature films, television, and the stage. After appearing in The Substitute and playing the villain in The Crow: City of Angels (both 1996), Brooks opted to try his hand at directing, and the result was  Johnny B Good (1998). It is about a young, urban black man who makes a positive change after suffering amnesia. Brooks returned to television for the short-lived series G vs E in 1999. In 2001 he made a guest appearance in NYPD Blue. Brooks is also well known by some science fiction fans for his appearance on Joss Whedon's Firefly, as a bounty hunter named Jubal Early in the existentialist series finale "Objects in Space". He also appeared as Hasdrabul Skaras in "Slayer", the fifth episode of the series Brimstone. He also appeared as Detective Ehrle in the short-lived Fox series Drive, alongside Nathan Fillion, with whom Brooks had worked on Firefly.

In addition to his film work, Brooks also founded his own production company, Flat Top Entertainment LLC. At the dawn of the millennium, Brooks released his first solo R&B album, Smooth Love, on Flat Top Records.

In March 2011, Brooks played the role of Harmond Wilkes in Radio Golf, written by August Wilson, at Geva Theatre Center in Rochester, New York. He played Frederick Douglass in the 2013 PBS series The Abolitionists.

Brooks stars as Patrick in the BET original series Being Mary Jane. It premiered July 2, 2013.

Brooks stars as Lead Marshal Pollack in Person of Interest, season 3, "The Devil's Share".

Brooks played Warden Gregory Wolfe in season 4 of The Flash, and Dwight Wise in Seasons 5 and 6 of the show Bosch.

Brooks plays Augustus Barringer on the UMC network comedy The Rich and the Ruthless (2017–present).

Filmography

Film

Television

Awards and nominations

References

External links

American male stage actors
American male film actors
American male singers
American male television actors
African-American male actors
African-American film directors
American rhythm and blues singers
Singers from Ohio
Male actors from Cleveland
Interlochen Center for the Arts alumni
Circle in the Square Theatre School alumni
Film directors from Michigan
Film directors from Ohio
20th-century American male actors
21st-century American male actors
1962 births
Living people
20th-century African-American male singers
21st-century African-American people